Crush Gear, known in Japan as , is a Japanese anime television series produced by Sunrise. It aired from October 2001 to January 2003, with 68 episodes. The series is about people throwing mechanical vehicles called "Gears" into a large ring to fight and "crush" one another. The story centers on Kouya Marino, a young boy who loves Crush Gear and dreams of becoming the world champion.

A spin-off series, titled Crush Gear Nitro, aired from February 2003 to January 2004.

Plot
Crush Gear is a fictional sport of battling machines that can be customized for maximum impact. Opponents meet at games where they Gear Fight, and the winner is determined when a fighter's Gear is able to push its opponent off the battlefield.

Gekitou! Crush Gear Turbo tells the story of Kouya Marino, an eleven-year-old boy who is a member of the Tobita Club, a Japanese Crush Gear team led by his late older brother, Yuhya Marino—the Asian Cup champion who was qualified for the World Cup finals—, who died in a tragic accident four years ago. Kouya's skills are nowhere near his brother's, and is nearly disqualified when he arrived late at the clubhouse for an elimination match. Yuhya's former teammate, Takeshi Manganji quits the team and forms a club of his own, forcing the rest of the members to join his new group, the Manganji Club. As the Tobita Club is facing the threat of extinction, Kouya refuses to give up and comes to inherit a Crush Gear from his late brother, the Garuda Eagle. Kouya must find a way to reinstate the Tobita Club back to its former glory. With the help of his new teammates, he eventually develops his techniques in Gear Fighting and comes to feel that Crush Gear is an important friend, leading him to victory. By recognizing the same feelings in his opponent, he becomes friends even with his rival.

Characters

Main characters

The main protagonist of the series and the captain of the Tobita Club, Kouya is a young Gear Fighter who aims to be the number one in the Crush Gear world.
Naotake Furusato, producer of Crush Gear Turbo, said that the creators "lost a lot of sleep over" trying to name the main character. Furusato credits director Shūji Iuchi with the final naming. The creators decided to use "Kouya" as the name "had a ring to it like brothers would have and that made it kind of realistic" and that the name literally means "wilderness" and "sounded right for a main character". Furusato added that the name "Kouya" made him want to see the character "grow up big and strong".

A Gear Fighter and member of the Tobita Club, Jirou is a former baseball pitcher who likes to eat red-bean buns. He is Kouya's closest teammate and friend. Jirou has a crush on the team's deputy owner, Lilika.

A Gear Fighter and member of the Tobita Club, Kyousuke is known as a genius Gear Master, a mechanic with superior skills in tuning, maintaining and customizing Crush Gears. He was Kuroudo's former teammate in Team Griffon.

A Gear Fighter and member of the Tobita Club, Kuroudo is a kendo swordsman with an excellent sense of hearing. He was Kyousuke's former teammate in Team Griffon.
Furusato said that Kuroudo's name originates from a samurai in the Edo period.

Kouya's childhood friend and the young manager of the Tobita Club team, Kaoru often provides informations about various Gear Fighters to her teammates.

The leader of the Manganji Club and Kouya's rival, Manganji is a powerful Gear Fighter who comes from a wealthy family that runs their own business company.
Furusato described the name "Manganji" as having "an image of wealth" – He added that "Japanese people are suckers for names that end in "ji"! (laughs)"

A key member of the Tobita Club serving as the team's deputy owner, Lilika is managing the group alongside Kaoru and she is watching over the members.

Recurring characters

A genius Gear Fighter and Kouya's deceased older brother, Yuhya was the late former captain of the Tobita Club and the former champion of the Asia Cup tournament. Four years prior to the start of the series, he was killed in an unfortunate accident just before the final match of the World Cup tournament. Yuhya often appears in flashbacks.
Furusato said that Yuhya's name was decided on early in the production.

Kouya and Yuhya's mother, who owns a café called La Mére du Marino.

Kouya and Yuhya's father and Marimo's husband.

Manganji's father, who is the president of the Manganji Group corporation.

Manganji's loyal sidekick and a member of the Manganji Club.

Manganji's loyal sidekick and a member of the Manganji Club.

A Gear Fighter and member of the Central Club, a team consisting of Gear Fighters from central Japan.

A Gear Fighter and member of the Central Club team.

A Gear Fighter and member of the Central Club team.

Shingo's younger sister and Kouya's classmate.

A Gear Fighter and former member of the Tobita Club during Yuhya's generation.

A snooker player and underground Gear Fighter who is a member of the Mighty Gears, a team by the Manganji Club consisting of Gear Fighters who are excelled in the field of sports. Eddie is Kuroudo's rival.

A skateboarder and one of the Gear Fighters of the Mighty Gears team. Taki is Jirou's best friend and former baseball catcher.

An intelligent shogi (chess) player and one of the Gear Fighters of the Mighty Gears team. Kishin is Kyousuke's arch-nemesis.

A GPX kart racer and one of the Gear Fighters of the Mighty Gears team.

A kendo master from Hokkaido.

A Gear Fighter and the captain of Team Griffon, who is a former teammate of Kuroudo and Kyousuke.

A Gear Fighter and member of Team Griffon.

A Gear Fighter and member of Team Griffon.

Manganji's grandfather, who is a renowned calligrapher.

Manganji's trusted bodyguard.

An outgoing, cheerful Gear Fighter and member of the Si Xing Hu Tuan, a team consisting of Chinese Gear Fighters. Wang Hu is Kouya's friend and rival.

A Gear Fighter and the only female member of the Si Xing Hu Tuan team, Lan Fang is Wang Hu's adoptive older sister. She is also Kyousuke's love interest.

The antagonistic coach of the Si Xing Hu Tuan team and Wang Hu's adoptive father, Ming Wu is ambitious, radical, and manipulative.

A Gear Fighter and the captain of the Si Xing Hu Tuan team.

A Gear Fighter and member of the Si Xing Hu Tuan team.

A Gear Fighter and member of the Manganji Dreams, an elite team by the Manganji Club consisting of gifted Gear Fighters with special training from the Manganji Laboratory.

A Gear Fighter and member of the Manganji Dreams team, who is Rin's twin brother.

A Gear Fighter and member of the Manganji Dreams team, who is Rai's twin sister.

A Gear Fighter and former member of the Tobita Club during Yuhya's generation. Alex is a Gear Master who is Jirou's friend.

A young Hollywood movie star and the arrogant Gear Fighter of the Star Brad team.

A Gear Fighter and the captain of the Euro Griffon team, Gallen is a strict coach whose training methods pushes the team members too hard.

The current chairwoman of the Gear Fight Association (GFA).

A mysterious Gear Fighter and member of Quo Vadis, a team consisting of Brazilian Gear Fighters.

The founder and coach of Quo Vadis team and Lilika's father. He was originally the founder and former owner of the Tobita Club during Yuhya's generation.

A 22-year-old Gear Master who befriended Kouya in San Francisco. Unbeknownst to everyone else, Shane is Gina Firestein's older brother and the legendary Gear God.

A Gear Fighter who participated in Gear Pancratium, an illegal underground competition that focuses on the destruction of Crush Gears in battle.

A gifted Gear Fighter and former champion of the Europe Cup tournament, Heinrich was a former member of the Weiss Ritters, a team consisting of German Gear Fighters. Four years prior to the start of the series, he quit Gear Fighting after the untimely death of his rival, Yuhya Marino in the day of the World Cup finals match.

Other characters

An arrogant member of the Manganji Club.

A chimpanzee at the zoo where the father of Nagidori siblings works. Q knows how to play Gear Fighting.

Kaoru's uncle, who lives in Hokkaido.

The host of the Illusion Cup tournament.

A Gear Fighter and member of Club 4649 (Yoroshiku).

A Gear Fighter and the captain of Pink Lips, a team consisting of all-female members.

A Gear Fighter and member of the Pink Lips team.

A female Crush Gear sportscaster.

The official mascot of the Gear Fight Association.

A South Korean Gear Fighter and member of Team Kim, who is Yong-sun's younger brother.

The coach of Team Kim and Yong-dae's older brother. Four years prior to the start of the series, Yong-sun was the opponent of Yuhya Marino in the finals of the Asia Cup tournament for 23 rounds.

A Singaporean Gear Fighter and member of Team Kemenangan.

The founder and former chairman of the Gear Fight Association (GFA), who is Shane and Gina's father.

A member of the Star Brad team and Brad's friend.

The host of the Crush Gear World Cup tournament.

A Gear Fighter and member of the Weiss Ritters team.

A Gear Fighter and member of the Weiss Ritters team.

A Gear Fighter and member of the Weiss Ritters team, who is Michael's older brother.

A Gear Fighter and member of the Weiss Ritters team, who is Rudolf's younger brother.

An Egyptian Gear Fighter and member of the Heliopolis team.

The host of the illegal Gear Pancratium competition.

An old mechanic who lives in the woods of Black Forest with a pet dog called Zeus. Richard is Shane and Gina's grandfather.

Heinrich's personal maid.

Film-only characters

He is responsible for stealing and using Kaiservern, the first Crush Gear created in the world.

A mysterious man at the GFA headquarters who holds a golden front weapon, Goldblade.

Production
Planning for Crush Gear Turbo began in March 2001, with intent to begin airing in October 2001. Naotake Furusato, producer of Crush Gear Turbo, received a toy car prototype that used two AA batteries and a motor. The toy car operated in circles instead of straight lines, and operators could cause them to collide with one another. Furusato used this concept to develop Crush Gear Turbo. According to Furusato the show was the first Sunrise production to "genuinely adopt the use of 3D graphics". Furusato added that the 3D rendering allowed the animators to "brilliantly express the stage presence of the Gear Fights" and incorporate effects not in real-life toy gears such as fireworks and smoke. According to Furusato 3D Production Chief  told Furusato that, because there are some elements that may only be expressed in 3D, the series ought to use 3D "to full effect". Furusato concluded that this caused the battle scenes to appear "a little bit unique". Furusato credited the customization and element attributes in each gear to Sunrise's "already well-established know-how". In addition the producer credited his own experience on Gear Fighter Dendoh and director Shūji Iuchi's experience on Mashin Hero Wataru in the formation of Crush Gear Turbo.

Furusato intended for the creators of the series to "encourage children to think and place on value on things like friendship and trust in others" and for the series to express deepening human relationships. He added that the series "got kind of a Heisei Era [1989-2019] "Kyojin no Hoshi" and "Ashita no Joe" feeling to it" and that the current generation of children "are fundamentally a more cheerful lot and go in for a bit of a slapstick flavor".

Media

Anime

Gekitou! Crush Gear Turbo, directed by Shūji Iuchi and produced by Sunrise's internal "Studio 10" division alongside Tokyu Agency, premiered in Japan on October 7, 2001, and concluded on January 26, 2003, after 68 episodes on Nagoya TV and TV Asahi. Atsuo Tobe is the character designer for the anime series, with Shinji Aramaki, Susumu Imaishi and Mitsuru Owa as the mechanical art designers. The musical score is composed by Kenichi Sudo and Yogo Kono. The Filipino dub of the series was premiered in the Philippines in April 2003, on ABS-CBN.

Film
 is a 20-minute short film that was released in Japan on July 20, 2002, as part of Toei Animation Summer 2002 Animation Fair. In this movie, Kouya and Manganji team up against a Gear Emperor who is controlling the world's first gear, Kaiservern. JAM Project performed two pieces of theme music: the insert song is "Get Up Crush Fighter!", and the ending theme is "Alright now! (Movie Re-mix ver.)" featuring Rika Matsumoto.

Manga
The manga adaptation is illustrated by Hisashi Matsumoto. The manga version featured original elements and unique developments, and the Gear Fighting is slightly more realistic than in the anime. It was serialized in Kodansha's magazine, Comic BomBom from October 2001 to January 2003, and released in tankōbon (book) format in four volumes from February 2002 to March 2003. The manga also included three bonus chapters.

The English-language version was licensed in Singapore by Chuang Yi.

Volume list

Video games
Two video games have been produced based on the series, both published by Bandai and released only in Japan. The PlayStation version of Gekitou! Crush Gear Turbo was first released on July 25, 2002. Gekitou! Crush Gear Turbo: Gear Champion League was released for WonderSwan Color on August 10, 2002.

DVD release

In Australia, the English dub of Crush Gear Turbo was released by Magna Pacific. Volumes one and two of the series were released on July 1, 2004; volumes three and four were released on September 8, 2004; volume five was released on October 6, 2004; volume six was released on November 10, 2004; and volume seven was released on January 19, 2005.

References

External links
Sunrise's official website for Crush Gear Turbo 
Sunrise's official website for Crush Gear Turbo 
Sunrise's official website for Crush Gear Turbo the Movie: Kaiservern's Ultimate Challenge 
Sunrise's official website for Crush Gear Turbo the Movie: Kaiservern's Ultimate Challenge 

Animax's official website for Crush Gear Turbo

2001 anime television series debuts
2001 manga
2003 anime television series debuts
2003 comics endings
ABS-CBN original programming
Animax original programming
Animated television series about children
Anime with original screenplays
Bandai Namco franchises
Children's manga
Comedy anime and manga
Comics based on toys
Fictional motorsports in anime and manga
Japanese children's animated action television series
Japanese children's animated science fantasy television series
Japanese children's animated sports television series
Shōnen manga
Sunrise (company)